Sir Richard Greene (1560 -  c. 23 June 1617) "The Younger", Knight and Lord of Bowridge Hill was the son of Sir Richard "of Stafford Ryvera" Grene and Joan Grene (née Converse),

Greene married in 1587 Mary Hooker (16 August 1567 - c. 1617), daughter of John Hooker who was MP for Exeter and Alice Powell; they "had at least eleven children," and "are buried in the family cemetery of Saint Mary the Virgin Parish Church Cemetery.").

References

1560 births
1617 deaths
English knights
16th-century English nobility
17th-century English nobility